The Monastery's Hunter (German: Der Klosterjäger) may refer to:

 The Monastery's Hunter (novel), an 1892 novel by Ludwig Ganghofer
 The Monastery's Hunter (1920 film), a German silent film
 The Monastery's Hunter (1935 film), a German sound film
 The Monastery's Hunter (1953 film), a West German film